Johannes Balthasar Brøndsted (5 October 1890 - 16 November 1965) was a Danish archaeologist and prehistorian.  He was a professor at the University of Copenhagen and director of the Danish National Museum.

Biography
Brøndsted was born  at  Grundfør in Jutland, Denmark. He was the son of Kristine Margrethe Bruun (1858-99) and Holger Brøndsted   (1849-1916). His father was a parish priest. In 1909, he took his matriculation examination at Sorø Academy, after which he briefly studied law and art history at the University of Copenhagen and took  his examination in classical philology in 1916. In 1920, he received his doctorate for his work on the relations between Anglo-Saxon art and Norse art during the  Viking era.

Brøndsted begins his work at the museum in 1917  and becomes deputy inspector at the National Museum  Department of Nordic Antiquity in 1918.
In 1922 and 1922, he worked in the field with Ejnar Dyggve (1887-1961) and excavated early Christian monuments in Dalmatia. His account of this excavation was published as Recherches à Salone (1928). He was a co-founder of the  peer-reviewed academic journal  Acta Archaeologica and  editor-in-chief (1930-48).

From 1941 through 1951, Brøndsted was a professor of Nordic archeology and European prehistory at the University of Copenhagen. He left this position to become the director of the National Museum of Denmark in Copenhagen, a position he held from 1951 through 1960. 

Johannes Brøndsted died at Copenhagen and was buried at Frederiksberg Ældre Kirkegård in Frederiksberg.

Selected works
 Recherches à Salone (1928)
 Danmarks Oldtid (three vols.; 2e; 1957-1959), a prehistory of Denmark
 The Vikings (1960) (English edition:  trans. Kalle Skov; Penguin, Harmondsworth; 1965)

Recognition and distinctions
 1948 - Royal Swedish Academy of Sciences (ord. med.}
 1948 -  Cross of Honour of the Order of the Dannebrog
 1952 - Corresponding Fellow of the British Academy  
 1953 - Gold medal of the Society of Antiquaries of London

References

1890 births
1965 deaths
Danish archaeologists
Prehistorians
University of Copenhagen alumni
Academic staff of the University of Copenhagen
Corresponding Fellows of the British Academy
20th-century archaeologists
Recipients of the Cross of Honour of the Order of the Dannebrog